Colin O'Neill (born 14 June 1963) is a Northern Irish former footballer who played for Ards, Larne, Ballymena, Portadown and Motherwell, as a midfielder.

O'Neill played in Motherwell's 1991 Scottish Cup Final winning side.

Honours
Motherwell 
 Scottish Cup: 1991

References

External links 
Colin O'Neill at Northern Ireland's Footballing Greats
Colin O'Neill at Post War English & Scottish Football League A–Z Player's Transfer Database
Colin O'Neill at MotherWELLnet

1963 births
Living people
Sportspeople from Derry (city)
Association football midfielders
Association footballers from Northern Ireland
Motherwell F.C. players
Portadown F.C. players
Northern Ireland international footballers
Ards F.C. players
Larne F.C. players
Ballymena United F.C. players
Scottish Football League players
NIFL Premiership players
Irish League representative players